Dillwynella texana is an extinct species of sea snail, a marine gastropod mollusk in the family Skeneidae.

Description
The shell contains four, spiral, smooth and shining whorls. The body whorl is nearly smooth but showing a slight tendency to bear furrows or lines radiating from the suture. The umbilicus is small. The aperture is round.

Distribution
This marine species was found as a fossil in the Lower Claiborne Eocene, Texas.

References

texana